Dale Saunders may refer to:

Dale Saunders (singer) (born 1978), Saint Kitts and Nevis-born London-based soca and fusion music singer
Dale Saunders (soccer) (born 1973), Trinidad and Tobago football player
E. Dale Saunders (1919–1995), American scholar of Romance languages and literature, Japanese Buddhism, classical Japanese literature, and East Asian civilization